George Kalinsky is a photographer. He has been the official photographer for Madison Square Garden since 1966 and also serves as the official photographer at Radio City Music Hall. In November 2010 the National Arts Club awarded him their Medal of Honor for Photography.

Kalinsky's photos have been in many major publications, such as Sports Illustrated, People, Newsweek, and The New York Times.  He has authored ten books.

In May 2009, the Rock and Roll Hall of Fame and Museum opened an exhibit dedicated to photographs Kalinsky took at some of Madison Square Garden's most legendary concerts.  Many of these photographs are now part of the Museum's permanent collection.

Beginning with the 2010 baseball season, the New York Mets, for whom Kalinsky had been the official photographer, are displaying throughout Citi Field many photographs by Kalinsky.

Biography
Kalinsky was honored with the 2017 Legends Award by the Pratt Institute with a dinner at the Mandarin Hotel in November 2017. The New-York Historical Society had an exhibit "New York through the Lens of George Kalinsky" featuring 80 images of Kalinsky's work from the last 50 years. The show opened to great reviews and will be on extended viewing until July 2018. The museum will make this exhibit part of their permanent collection. In February 2018, Sports Business Journal featured Kalinsky and his career on the front page of their magazine. Frank Sinatra Enterprises is also producing a documentary on Kalinsky's 50-year career.

Memorable Moments

Championships won by New York City teams
1970 NBA Finals–Knicks defeat the Los Angeles Lakers for their first NBA championship.
1986 World Series–Mets defeat the Boston Red Sox to win World Series.
1994 Stanley Cup Finals–Rangers win Stanley Cup–first in 54 years–over the Vancouver Canucks.

Political Conventions
1980 Democratic National Convention
1992 Democratic National Convention
2004 Republican National Convention

Other moments
The Fight of the Century, March 8, 1971, between champion Joe Frazier and challenger Muhammad Ali
The Concert for Bangladesh, August 1, 1971
Elvis Presley's June 9–11, 1972 4 back to back sold-out concerts. One of his photos,   taken during that week end, was enlarged  in the shape of a three-story,  36 x  72  feet   billboard   and  unveiled at a  Times Square building  in New York City  on April 1, 2008. 
Ali-Frazier II, January 28, 1974
John Lennon's final live performance, November 28, 1974
Pope John Paul II's papal mass at Madison Square Garden, October 3, 1979
Wayne Gretzky's final game, April 18, 1999
Subway Series of 2000
The Concert for New York City to honor the victims of the September 11 attacks, October 20, 2001
From the Big Apple to the Big Easy concert to raise funds for the Hurricane Katrina relief efforts, September 20, 2005

Honors and awards

 2001 – Recipient of the highest award given by the photography industry (PMDA) as International Photographer of the Year.
 2001 – Named "Sportsman of the Year" by the National Center for Disabilities, an organization for which he served as co-chairman.
 2001 – Named "Man of the Year" by Pratt Institute, where he had been a design student.
 2007 – Inducted into the National Jewish Sports Hall of Fame.
 2008 – Recipient of Pratt Institute's Lifetime Achievement Award.
 2010 – New York City Basketball Hall of Fame inductee.
 2010 – Recipient of National Arts Club's Medal of Honor for Photography.
 2015 – Recipient of New York Knicks' Dick McGuire Legacy Award.
 2017 – Recipient of Pratt Institute's Legends Award.
 Served on the Fulbright Scholarship Foundation
 Included in New York Resident's list of top 100 New Yorkers.

References

External links
George Kalinsky
The George Kalinsky Photographs at the New-York Historical Society.

Living people
New York Knicks
New York Mets
New York Rangers
People from New York (state)
Jewish American sportspeople
Year of birth missing (living people)
21st-century American Jews